Jan Baptist Brueghel (baptised 26 December 1647 – 1719) was a Flemish Baroque flower painter.

Biography
Brueghel was born in Antwerp.  He travelled to Rome where he joined the Bentvueghels, an association of mainly Dutch and Flemish artists working in Rome. It was customary for the Bentvueghels to adopt an appealing nickname, the so-called 'bent name'. Jan Baptist Brueghel was given the bent name "Meleager".   The early Dutch biographer Houbraken mentioned Brueghel in a poem about the Bentvueghels at the end of his second volume on artists. Houbraken mentioned him again in his third volume in the list of artists who signed Abraham Genoels' bentbrief.

He was the younger brother of Abraham Brueghel who accompanied him to Naples, but returned to Rome after his brother's death. Like his brother, he is known for fruit still lifes.

Jan Baptist Brueghel died in Rome.

References

Sources
Jan Baptist Brueghel on Artnet

1647 births
1719 deaths
Flemish Baroque painters
Flemish still life painters
Members of the Bentvueghels
Artists from Antwerp
Jan c
Sibling artists